Eugrapheus longehamatus is a species of beetle in the family Cerambycidae. It was described by Fairmaire in 1897.

References

Desmiphorini
Beetles described in 1897